Douglas Langway (October 5, 1970 – October 9, 2022) was an American screenwriter and film director, best known for his film trilogy BearCity,  BearCity 2: The Proposal, and Bear City 3. His first feature film, Raising Heroes, was released in 1996.

Langway was the president and CEO of Sharpleft Studios, a media and marketing firm which also served as his production studio for the BearCity films. He was openly gay. He also appeared as himself in Malcolm Ingram's 2010 documentary film Bear Nation, and was a producer of Ingram's 2015 documentary film Out to Win.

Doug died on October 9, 2022, from liver cancer. He was 52 years old.

References

External links

1970 births
2022 deaths
American film directors
American male screenwriters
American film producers
American gay writers
LGBT film directors
LGBT producers
American LGBT screenwriters
21st-century LGBT people